West End Village Historic District is a national historic district located at Kings Mountain, Cleveland County, North Carolina.  It encompasses 100 contributing buildings and 1 contributing structure in a residential section of Kings Mountain.  The houses date between about 1882 and 1955, and include representative examples of Queen Anne, Colonial Revival, and Bungalow / American Craftsman architectural styles.

It was listed on the National Register of Historic Places in 2009.

Gallery

References

Historic districts on the National Register of Historic Places in North Carolina
Kings Mountain, North Carolina
Colonial Revival architecture in North Carolina
Queen Anne architecture in North Carolina
Buildings and structures in Cleveland County, North Carolina
National Register of Historic Places in Cleveland County, North Carolina